The 2019 CECAFA U15 Championship was the first CECAFA U-15 Championship organized by CECAFA (Council of East and Central Africa Football Association). It was held in Eritrea (it is the first time in recent times that an official international football tournament is being staged in Eritrea.)

Venues

Cicero Stadium, Asmara

Teams

Officials

Referees
 William Oloya (Uganda) 
 Sabri Mohammed Fadul (Sudan) 
 Lemma Nigussi (Ethiopia) 
 Biruk Yemanebirhan Kassaun (Ethiopia) 
 Idris Osman Mohammed (Eritrea) 
 Yodit Hagos (Eritrea) 

Assistant Referees
 Olibo George Primato (South Sudan) 
 Nagi Subahi Ahmed (Sudan) 
 Ahmed Abdulahi Farah (Somalia) 
 Soud Iddi Lila (Tanzania)
 Emery Niyongabo (Burundi)
 Joshua Achila  (Kenya) 
 Samuel Kuria (Kenya) 
 Eyobel Michael (Eritrea) 
 Aron Ghebrekrstos (Eritrea)
 Elsa Johannes (Eritrea)

Group stage

Group A

Group B

Knockout stage

Semi-finals

3rd Place Match

Final

Winner

Notes

References

CECAFA competitions
2019 in African football